Aristeidis Savvas Roubanis (alternate spelling: Aristidis) (9 March 1932, Tripoli – 13 January 2018, Greece) was a Greek international basketball player and javelin thrower. During his club basketball career, his nickname was "Bulldozer".

Basketball career

Club career
Roubanis was a member of the Panellinios Basketball Club and its famous 1950s era "Golden Five". With Panellinios, he won 3 Greek League championships, in the years 1953, 1955, and 1957. He also won two European Club Championships with the club, as he won the 1955 Brussels Basketball Tournament and the 1956 San Remo Basketball Tournament. While he was also a runner-up at the 1954 San Remo Tournament.

National team career
Roubanis was a member of the senior men's Greek national basketball team. With Greece, Roubanis competed at the 1951 EuroBasket, the 1952 Summer Olympic Games , and the 1955 Mediterranean Games, where he won a bronze medal. He finished his national team career with 25 caps, in which he scored 275 points for the Greek national team.

Javelin
Roubanis competed in the men's javelin throw, at the 1952 Helsinki Summer Olympics. He also competed in the shot put.

Personal life
Roubanis was the younger brother of Georgios Roubanis, a pole vaulter who won a bronze medal at the 1956 Summer Olympic Games. Georgios was also the 1956 Greek Athlete of the Year.

References

External links
Basket.gr 
Segas.gr 

1932 births
2018 deaths
Athletes (track and field) at the 1952 Summer Olympics
Basketball players at the 1952 Summer Olympics
Centers (basketball)
Greek Basket League players
Greek male javelin throwers
Greek men's basketball players
Olympic athletes of Greece
Olympic basketball players of Greece
Panellinios B.C. players
Sportspeople from Tripoli, Greece
Power forwards (basketball)
Reyer Venezia players
Athletes from Tripoli, Greece